This is a list of electoral district results for the 1950 Queensland state election.

Results by electoral district

Aubigny

Balonne

Barambah

Barcoo

Baroona

Belyando

Bremer

Brisbane

Bulimba

By-election 

 This by-election was caused by the result of the election being voided by the Court of Disputed Returns. It was held on 14 April 1951.

Bundaberg

Buranda

Burdekin

Cairns

Callide

Carnarvon

Carpentaria

Charters Towers

Chermside

Clayfield

Condamine

Cook

Cooroora

Coorparoo

Cunningham

Darlington

Fassifern

Fitzroy

Flinders

Fortitude Valley

By-election 

 This by-election was caused by the death of Samuel Brassington. It was held on 18 November 1950.

Gregory

Haughton

Hinchinbrook

Ipswich

Isis

Ithaca

By-election 

 This by-election was caused by the death of Ned Hanlon. It was held on 5 April 1952.

Kedron

By-election 

 This by-election was caused by the resignation of Bruce Pie. It was held on 14 March 1951.

Kelvin Grove

Keppel

By-election 

 This by-election was caused by the death of Walter Ingram. It was held on 25 October 1952.

Kurilpa

Landsborough

Lockyer

Mackay

Mackenzie

Marodian

Maryborough

Merthyr

Mirani

Mount Coot-tha

Mount Gravatt

Mourilyan

Mulgrave

Mundingburra

Murrumba

Nash

Norman

North Toowoomba

Nundah

Port Curtis

Rockhampton

Roma

Sandgate

Sherwood

Somerset

South Brisbane

Southport

Tablelands

Toowong

Toowoomba

Townsville

Warrego

By-election 

 This by-election was caused by the death of Harry O'Shea. It was held on 3 March 1951.

Warwick

Whitsunday

Windsor

Wynnum

Yeronga

See also 

 1950 Queensland state election
 Candidates of the Queensland state election, 1950
 Members of the Queensland Legislative Assembly, 1950-1953

References 

Results of Queensland elections